Assault on the Wayne is a 1971 American Cold War-themed action thriller TV film starring Joseph Cotten, Lloyd Haynes, Dewey Martin, Leonard Nimoy and William Windom. It aired on January 12, 1971, in the ABC Movie of the Week space. The film was originally broadcast on the same night as All in the Family premiered.

Premise 
A US Navy nuclear submarine is sabotaged to steal an anti-ballistic missile guidance system.

Cast
 Joseph Cotten as Admiral
 Lloyd Haynes as Lt. Dave Burston
 Dewey Martin as Skip Langley
 Leonard Nimoy as Commander Phil Kettenring
 William Windom as Captain Frank Reardon
 Keenan Wynn as Orville Kelly
 Malachi Throne as Dr. Dykers
 Sam Elliott as Ensign William 'Bill' Sandover
 Ivor Barry as Donald Ellington
 Ron Masak as CPO Corky Schmidt
 Lee Stanley as Lt. Manners

References

External links

1971 television films
1971 films
1970s spy action films
1970s action thriller films
American spy action films
ABC Movie of the Week
Films directed by Marvin J. Chomsky
Cold War submarine films
Cold War spy films
Techno-thriller films
Films about the United States Marine Corps
Films scored by Leith Stevens
American thriller television films
Action television films
1971 directorial debut films
1970s English-language films
1970s American films